Expeditie Robinson: 2007, was the eighth Dutch/Belgian version of the Swedish show Expedition Robinson, or Survivor as it is referred to in some countries. This season began airing on September 30, 2007 and concluded on December 27, 2007.

Season highlights

Major twist
The initial major twist this season was that for the first time in the history of any Survivor franchise worldwide one hundred contestants would take part in a single season. This twist, however, didn't last very long as in episode 2 twenty five of the contestants voluntarily left the game, in episode 3 twenty one contestants were eliminated as they were not picked to be on either the North team or the South team, in episode 4 thirteen members of the North team were eliminated following a loss in the first immunity challenge, in episode 5 the entire South team was eliminated following their loss at the second immunity challenge, and in episode 6 eight members of the North team were eliminated following an elimination challenge to determine who would be the final group of contestants that would make up the jury and final two.

Secret Island
From episode 6 on all eliminated contestants were sent to the "Secret island", those living on the island would each be given a chance to return to the game through a win at an immunity challenge or through a vote before the semi-finals. Aside from Nelleke and Kristien who left the competition in episode 10, and Frans who was ejected from episode 12, all contestants that went to the island remained there until the vote to return. Following the vote to return, Muriël returned to the competition. Muriel's return was short lived as she, Lieke, and Marcel were all eliminated in the semi-final rounds. Ultimately, it was Vincent who beat the odds and went on to win the season over Willem by a jury vote of 4-3.

Top 12 Contestants

Voting history

 In episode 5, the tribes competed in a sudden death immunity challenge in which the losing tribe would be eliminated.

 In episode 6, the members of the red tribe competed in a sudden death individual challenge in order to determine which twelve contestants would be eligible to be part of the jury.

 Following the third tribal council vote, there was a tie between Loek and Muriël. As Muriël
had received more votes than Loek at prior tribal councils she was eliminated.

 At the sixth tribal council, Lieke voided her own vote.

 Prior to the semi-finals, the contestants living on the Secret island took part in a series of challenges which if won would grant them extra votes in the vote for which contestant should return to the game. Hans and Mieke earned 2 extra votes, Muriël and Saskia earned 1.

External links
http://worldofbigbrother.com/Survivor/BN/9/about.shtml

Expeditie Robinson seasons
2007 Dutch television seasons
2007 Belgian television seasons